Indiana State Teachers College may refer to former names of:
Indiana University of Pennsylvania from 1927 to 1959
Indiana State University from 1929 to 1965